History of Love is a 2018 Slovenian drama film directed by Sonja Prosenc. It was selected as the Slovenian entry for the Best International Feature Film at the 92nd Academy Awards, but it was not nominated.

Plot
A 17-year-old girl mourning her mother's death is drawn into an altered reality to make sense of her emotions.

Cast
 Kristoffer Joner as The conductor
 Doroteja Nadrah as Iva
 Zita Fusco as Mother

See also
 List of submissions to the 92nd Academy Awards for Best International Feature Film
 List of Slovenian submissions for the Academy Award for Best International Feature Film

References

External links
 

2018 films
2018 drama films
Slovene-language films
Slovenian drama films
Films about grieving